In the mathematical field of topology, a sphere bundle is a fiber bundle in which the fibers are spheres  of some dimension n. Similarly, in a disk bundle, the fibers are disks . From a topological perspective, there is no difference between sphere bundles and disk bundles: this is a consequence of the Alexander trick, which implies 

An example of a sphere bundle is the torus, which is orientable and has  fibers over an  base space. The non-orientable Klein bottle also has  fibers over an  base space, but has a twist that produces a reversal of orientation as one follows the loop around the base space.

A circle bundle is a special case of a sphere bundle.

Orientation of a sphere bundle 

A sphere bundle that is a product space is orientable, as is any sphere bundle over a simply connected space.

If E be a real vector bundle on a space X and if E is given an orientation, then a sphere bundle formed from E, Sph(E), inherits the orientation of E.

Spherical fibration 
A spherical fibration, a generalization of the concept of a sphere bundle, is a fibration whose fibers are homotopy equivalent to spheres. For example, the fibration

has fibers homotopy equivalent to Sn.

See also 
Smale conjecture

Notes

References 
Dennis Sullivan, Geometric Topology, the 1970 MIT notes

Further reading 
The Adams conjecture I
Johannes Ebert, The Adams Conjecture, after Edgar Brown
Strunk, Florian. On motivic spherical bundles

External links 
Is it true that all sphere bundles are boundaries of disk bundles?
https://ncatlab.org/nlab/show/spherical+fibration

Algebraic topology
Fiber bundles